Robyn Holmes (born 19 February 1964) is an Australian field hockey player. She competed in the women's tournament at the 1984 Summer Olympics.

References

External links
 

1964 births
Living people
Australian female field hockey players
Olympic field hockey players of Australia
Field hockey players at the 1984 Summer Olympics
Place of birth missing (living people)